The Infrastructure Development Bank of Zimbabwe (IDBZ) is a government-owned development bank in Zimbabwe, mandated to fund long and medium term funding for key infrastructure projects, including in the areas of transportation, housing, energy, ICT, water and sanitation.

Location
The headquarters of the bank are located at IDBZ House, 99 Gamal Abdel Nasser Road, in Harare, the capital city of Zimbabwe. The geographical coordinates of the bank's headquarters are: 17°49'59.0"S, 31°02'23.0"E (Latitude:-17.833056; Longitude:31.039722).

Overview
The IDBZ was established 31 August 2005, taking over the assets and liabilities of the former Zimbabwe Development Bank (“ZDB”). It was founded, primarily as a vehicle for the promotion of economic development, economic growth and improvement of the living standards of Zimbabweans, through the development of infrastructure. Infrastructure includes energy, housing, transport, information communication technology (ICT), water and sanitation, among other projects. The bank serves as an infrastructure development finance institution.

As of 31 December 2017, the bank's total assets were valued at US$188,983,280 with US$54,780,479 in shareholders' equity. In late August 2018, the Government of Zimbabwe increased the shareholding and capitalization of the bank by US$150 million, increasing the bank's total assets to over US$330 million and shareholding to over US$200 million.

Board of directors
As of September 2018, IDBZ's board of directors consisted of:

 Willard Lowenstern Manungo: Chairman
 Thomas Zondo Sakala: Chief Executive Officer
 Vavarirai Humwe Choga
 Nelson Kudenga
 Joseph Mhakayakora
 Shadreck Sariri Mlambo
 Margaret Mazvita Mukahanana-Sangarwe
 Charles Simbarashe Tawha

Management
As of September 2018, IDBZ's management team was:

 Thomas Zondo Sakala: Chief Executive Officer
 Desmond Matete: Director Infrastructure Projects
 Cassius Gambinga: Director of Finance
 Phillip Tadiwa: Director Corporate Services and Human Resources.

See also
 Economy of Zimbabwe
 List of banks in Zimbabwe
 Trade and Development Bank
 Southern African Development Community
 World Bank

References

External links
 

Banks of Zimbabwe
Companies based in Harare
Government-owned companies of Zimbabwe
Banks established in 2005
2005 establishments in Zimbabwe